The following highways are numbered 967:

United States